Puerto Rican reggae band Cultura Profética has released five studio albums, three live albums, and one tribute album. The group released its debut album, Canción de Alerta, in 1998. The group followed up with Ideas Nuevas in 2000, and then Diario in 2004. After relocating to Mexico, the band released M.O.T.A. in 2005. In 2010, La Dulzura was released, which took a more romantic lyrical focus and produced the radio hit "La Complicidad". Cultura Profética released its most recent single, "Saca, Prende y Sorprende" in 2014, and is reported to be working on a new album.

Studio albums
 Canción de Alerta (1998)
 Ideas Nuevas (1999)
 Diario (2002)
 M.O.T.A. (2005)
 La Dulzura (2010)

Live albums
 Cultura en Vivo (2001)
 En Vivo via Facebook (2011)
 15 Aniversario el el Luna Park (2012)

Tribute Albums
 Tribute to the Legend: Bob Marley (2007)

Reggae discographies
Discographies of Puerto Rican artists